Black Empire is Japanese heavy metal band Anthem's sixth studio album since their reformation in the year 2000.

Track listing
 "Black Empire" - 4:35
 "Heat of the Night" - 4:06
 "You" - 3:56
 "Go Insane" - 4:43
 "Walk Through the Night" - 4:48
 "Emptiness World" - 5:13
 "Telling You" - 4:13
 "Pilgrim" - 4:23
 "Awake" - 4:56
 "Perfect Crawler" - 4:51

Personnel

Band members
Eizo Sakamoto - vocals
Akio Shimizu - guitars
Naoto Shibata - bass, producer
Hirotsugu Homma - drums

References

2008 albums
Anthem (band) albums
Victor Entertainment albums